HD 90853 is a single star in the southern constellation Carina. It has the Bayer designation s Carinae, while HD 98053 is the identifier from the Henry Draper catalogue. This is a variable star with an apparent visual magnitude that ranges from 3.36 down to 3.51, and thus is bright enough to be visible to the naked eye. It is located at a distance of approximately 1,340 light-years from the Sun based on parallax, and has an absolute magnitude of −4.44. The star is drifting further away with a radial velocity of +9 km/s.

This is an aging bright giant or supergiant star that has been assigned stellar classifications of F2II and F0Ib, respectively. It has seven times the mass of the Sun and has expanded to 45 times the Sun's radius. It is spinning with a projected rotational velocity of 22 km/s.

References 

F-type bright giants
Carinae, s
Carina (constellation)
Durchmusterung objects
090853
051232
4114